Veissella is a genus of African jumping spiders that was first described by F. R. Wanless in 1984.  it contains two species, found in Africa: V. durbani and V. milloti.

"The genus name is an arbitrary combination of letters; the gender is considered feminine".

References

External links
 Diagnostic drawings

Salticidae genera
Salticidae
Spiders of Africa